Scopula quintaria is a moth of the family Geometridae, first described by Louis Beethoven Prout in 1916. It occurs in Malawi, South Africa and Príncipe.

Subspecies
Scopula quintaria quintaria (South Africa)
Scopula quintaria principis Prout, 1932 (Príncipe)

References

Moths described in 1916
quintaria
Moths of São Tomé and Príncipe
Moths of Sub-Saharan Africa
Lepidoptera of Malawi
Lepidoptera of South Africa
Taxa named by Louis Beethoven Prout